Biclonuncaria juanita is a species of moth of the family Tortricidae. It is found in Tamaulipas, Mexico.

References

Moths described in 1993
Polyorthini